Jokerit F.C. is a  football club based in Helsinki, Finland which competes in the Tali Halli TN. The club is the "phoenix club" of FC Jokerit, who were founded in 1999 and were sold to rivals HJK Helsinki in 2004, and re- branded as Klubi-04. The club currently competes at the Sonera Stadium, recently reconstructed in 2010, which has a full capacity of 10,770.

Squad
Below is the team list of Jokerit FC. The majority of the team are Finnish, with two foreign (non-Finnish) players: from Ukraine and Mexico respectively.

Achievements

FC Jokerit have won their domestic league, Tali Halli TN, once. They have not achieved any league cup silverware. They first competed in the Finnish Suomen Cup in the 2014/2015 season, reaching the 3rd round. They have reached the 3rd round of the Finnish Suomen Cup twice, losing to FC Viikingit II 1-5 the first time, and to Toolon Wesa 0-2 the second time.

Coaching staff

Jokerit FC has 4 coaches: Unto Virkkala, the manager and head coach, Jussi Marttila, the assistant head coach and youth team manager, Denys Pervov, the goalkeeping coach and first- team goalkeeper and Kimmo Stalhammer, the coach and opposition scout.

Youth Team and Academy

Jokerit FC 2 is Jokerit FC's youth academy. It is managed by Jussi Marttila, who is also the first team's Assistant Head Coach.

Academy Players
Below is the list of Jokerit FC 2's players.

Under-8's Teams
FC Jokerit have run coaching sessions and an under-8's section for children since the foundation of the club in 2012. The sessions are run by the club's manager, Unto Virkkala, and the club's Academy manager, Jussi Marttilla. The Under-8's section play fixtures during the week. Most of the club's players have come up through these sections.

References

Jokerit